Santa María de Benquerencia, also known as (el) Polígono, is a district (number 3) of Toledo, Spain.

Detached from the city core, it lies to the east of the former, at the left-bank of the Tagus. Its origins trace back to 1964 when the earth moving works intending to built an industrial area started. However, not much after, the first neighbors installed in 1971, eventually also becoming a residential area.

As of 1 January 2018, it has a population of 22,110 inhabitants: 21,911 in the residential area neighborhood (the most populated neighborhood in the municipality) and 199 in the industrial area neighborhood.

References 

Toledo, Spain